Harry Pilling (23 February 1943 – 22 September 2012) was an English cricketer. A right-handed batsman, Pilling scored over 15,000 first-class runs for Lancashire, whom he played county cricket for from 1962 to 1982.

One of his most memorable innings for Lancashire was an unbeaten 70 against Sussex, which helped secure his county's first Gillette Cup success in 1970.

References

External links
The Guardian obituary

1943 births
2012 deaths
Cricketers from Ashton-under-Lyne
English cricketers
Lancashire cricketers
Marylebone Cricket Club cricketers
D. H. Robins' XI cricketers